Xenesthis is a genus of tarantulas that was first described by Eugène Louis Simon in 1891.  it contains four species, found in Colombia and Venezuela, though it was previously considered to be found in Panama.

Diagnosis 
There distinguishing factor is based on the scopulae of the metatarsus 4 is covering nearly the entire length and circumference of the segment. At the time it was the only known New World tarantula genus to own this trait, which is not the case today.

Species 
 it contains 4 species according to the world spider catalog:

 Xenesthis colombiana Simon, 1891 (Type) - Colombia 
 Xenesthis immanis (Ausserer, 1875) - Colombia and Venezuela
 Xenesthis intermedia Schiapelli & Gerschman, 1945 - Venezuela
 Xenesthis monstrosa Pocock, 1903 - Colombia

Transferred to other genera 
 Xenesthis cubana Franganillo, 1930 → Citharacanthus spinicrus

See also
 List of Theraphosidae species

References

Theraphosidae genera
Spiders of Central America
Spiders of South America
Theraphosidae